The 1996 MTV Movie Awards was hosted by Ben Stiller and Janeane Garofalo.

Performers
 Whitney Houston — "Why Does It Hurt So Bad"
 Garbage — "Only Happy When It Rains"
 Adam Sandler — "Mel Gibson"
 Fugees and Roberta Flack — "Killing Me Softly"

Awards
Winners are listed first and highlighted in bold. There was also an award unique to that year called "Best Sandwich in a Movie".

References

 1996
Mtv Movie Awards